Bellingeweer is part of the town of Winsum, in Groningen, Netherlands. Originally, it was an independent village built on a wierde. Bellingeweer had its own medieval church, which was demolished in 1824. However, the cemetery is still there.

The wierde on which the village is built dates from around the year 1 AD and is still clearly visible.

References

External links 
 

Populated places in Groningen (province)
Het Hogeland